Tamanna Miah is a British Bangladeshi campaigner, public speaker, media spokesperson and chair of trustees for a refugee charity.

Early life 
Miah was born into a Bengali Muslim family in Sylhet, Bangladesh and moved to the United Kingdom when she was six months old with her parents. She attended The Bradbourne School for girls (now Knole Academy), and completed her A Levels in Sevenoaks, Kent. She is studying Media & Communications and Politics & Governance at Canterbury Christ Church University.

Career
Miah has been involved in youth, community, voluntary, and politics sector for over 12 years, for many charities and organisations. She campaigns on many issues including racism, bullying, education, mental health, discrimination, Islamophobia.

In 2004, Miah started her journey in social action, volunteering and campaigning from the age of 11, where she helped her father, who set up Bangladesh Welfare Association in Tunbridge Wells, an organisation that brought older and younger generations together. Miah went on to become involved in other organisations in her area, was selected to become Chair of Sevenoaks and Kent Youth County Councils, followed by UK Youth Parliament South East, British Youth Council, UK Young Ambassador for Europe.

Awards 
In July 2011, Miah won the Special Achievement Try Angle Award, for Citizenship, Volunteering and Service to the community and was the Overall Winner for Sevenoaks, Dartford and Gravesend.

Miah was nominated by Kent Integrated Youth Services for a Diana Award for Champion Volunteer and received both awards, in November 2011 and January 2012 for her commitment to volunteering and campaigning for young people in Kent.

In January 2012 she received the Make a Difference, Youth on Board Award from the British Youth Council. She won The Janey Antoniou Award 2016 by the charity Rethink Mental Illness.

At the first National Hate Crime Awards, Miah was winner of Young Upstander Award 2016 on 11 November 2016.

References

Bangladeshi activists
Living people
British people of Bangladeshi descent
People from Sylhet
21st-century Bengalis
1993 births